The Hyderabad Information Technology and Engineering Consultancy City, abbreviated as HITEC City, is an Indian information technology, engineering, health informatics, and bioinformatics, financial business district located in Hyderabad, Telangana, India. HITEC City is within  of the residential and commercial suburb of Jubilee Hills.

History
HITEC City was commissioned by the erstwhile combined Government of Andhra Pradesh, adjoining Cyberabad to the west of Hyderabad and was inaugurated by then Prime Minister of India Atal Bihari Vajpayee on 22 November 1998.  In 1997, The then Chief Minister N. Chandra Babu Naidu travelled to Southeast Asia to meet potential investors and to ‘market the state’ and was impressed with the larger technology related developments of Singapore and Malaysia – especially Multimedia Super Corridor (MSC) near Kuala Lumpur. Soon after coming back from his Southeast Asia tour, Naidu initiated a $350 million knowledge enclave in Hyderabad, leading to birth of HITEC City. The main aim was to have an integrated townships for IT professionals to work and live, while the construction of hitec city is one of the biggest technological revolutions of Hyderabad with a modern infrastructure and amenities including housing colonies, shopping complexes, auditoriums, showrooms, health clubs, cafeterias and banks are abundant making the city a magnet for technology giants while shaping the modern tech landscape in very globally competitive.

It was commissioned by Larsen and Toubro Limited through its Special Purpose Vehicle, L&T Hitech City Limited, a joint venture company of L&T Infocity Limited and erstwhile Andhra Pradesh Industrial Infrastructure Corporation. The project offers multitenanted as well as Built-to-suit (BTS) facilities.

Cityscape

Foundation of HITEC City

 
Cyber Towers was the first tower to be built for promotion of Information Technology (IT) within 14 months and the attractive unique design was selected by N. Chandrababu Naidu in 1997 to stand as a Monument in city of Hyderabad and as architectural masterpiece in the center of Cyberabad with transforming the City of Pearls, Hyderabad as the City of Destiny for IT and Pharmaceutical companies while also set up a separate Cyberabad Metropolitan Police Commissionerate and totally revamped the way of policing under safety and surveillance accomplishing HITEC City has emerged as the symbolic heart of cosmopolitan Hyderabad and it was initially marketed by both the officials of APIIC and L&T Infocity Ltd (the public and private sector partner). Companies such as Orbees Business Solutions, Knowledge Matrix India Pvt Ltd., 7 Hills Business Solutions, AppLabs, Keane Inc NTT DATA, Microsoft, Patni Computer Systems, Oracle Corporation, GE Capital, Whishworks, Prithvi Information Solutions, Naia Software Solutions India Pvt Ltd., Four Soft operate and call centers operate from this four-quadrant, 10-story building. The Cyber Towers building is divided into four quadrants with a large fountain in the middle of the quadrants. Another large building of office space named Cyber Gateway has been built comprises over 866,000 square feet (80,500 square meters) across 8 acres (3.25 ha).

Key Campuses

Laxmi Cyber City 
Laxmi Cyber City, started construction from 2005 and built span of two years by 2007 operations started. It consists of three blocks.
A block- HSBC GLT
B block- E&Y, Inventiv, etc.
C block- ADP 
The property is close to 1 Million sft. and shares its heritage with Laxmi Cyber Centre (Banjara Hills), Laxmi CentrePoint (Begumpet GE), Laxmi Cyber Point, Laxmi Cyber Towers SEZ etc.

R & D center 

Microsoft India Development Center is one of Microsoft's largest R&D centers outside the Redmond headquarters, Washington state. Set up in Hyderabad in 1998. Then Chief minister N. Chandrababu Naidu arranged a meeting with Bill Gates founder of Microsoft  and discussed about the infrastructure provided and human resources availability in the state while managed him to build their sprawling 54 acres Microsoft campus of LEED Gold Certification for one of its buildings in hyderabad. The Microsoft Corporation is the first multinational company to build a research and development center in Cyberabad.

L&T Infocity 
Infocity is the first software technology park layout in HITEC CITY  which attracted
major technology companies like Accenture, Microsoft, Oracle, s2Tech Technologies etc.

CII - Sohrabji Godrej Green Business Centre 
CII-Sohrabji Godrej Green Business Centre (CII-Godrej GBC) was established in the year 2004, as CII's Developmental Institute on Green Practices & Businesses, aimed at offering advisory services on conservation of natural resources. The Green Business Centre was inaugurated by His Excellency Dr. A. P. J. Abdul Kalam, the then President of India on 14 July 2004.

The Services of Green Business Centre include energy management, green buildings, green companies, renewable energy, GHG inventorisation, green product certification, waste management, and cleaner production process.

Hyderabad International Convention Centre 

In process of making India's favorite meetings and events destination in Hyderabad, then chief minister N. Chandrababu Naidu created a convention hub with the Hyderabad International Convention Centre, is a purpose-built, state-of-the-art convention facility, the first of its kind in South Asia. The convention centre was built by Emaar MGF of India. It has been the winner of the excellence award for “Best Standalone Convention Centre” for a record four times, nationally awarded by Ministry of Tourism, Government of India and the company is part owned by Emaar of UAE. The facility is managed by Accor Hospitality.
The Hyderabad International Convention Centre with 5,000 seating capacity is India's largest convention facility. It is an integrated  covering . The centre can be configured to increase seating capacity to about 6,500. The convention center is connected to Novotel Hyderabad, an international business hotel, it has 288 rooms and is equipped with meeting rooms, restaurants, business centre, spa and a health club.

Raheja Mindspace IT Park 

The Mindspace IT Park includes residential, recreational, entertainment, and retail spaces.
Spread across , this layout also provides about 40% open space with telecommunications and civic infrastructure, wide roads and greenery. The district witnessed immediate success with over  built and occupied within just 14 months of starting the project. The park provides both multi-tenant and built to suit facilities. Companies such as Hyundai Mobis, IBM, Accenture, CSC, Bank of America, Facebook and Novartis have built to suit facilities in the park with 10000 workers within them. Other companies in multitenant facilities include Broadcom Inc., Deloitte, Parexel, Syneos Health, Qualcomm, Zensar Technologies Ltd, Tech Mahindra, Oracle, Accenture, Amazon, General Electric, OpenText, IGATE, Verizon, Thomson Reuters, Wells Fargo and TietoEVRY. As of 2008 March, 20,000 people work in the park. The park is a notified SEZ and is set to accommodate about 55,000 IT workers making it the largest of the IT parks in HITEC city. The park also has a Westin Hotel and Inorbit Mall which have been opened in the second half of 2009.

Map of Mindspace Park

 Building - 1  - Accenture.
 Building - 2  -Tech Mahindra, GE, ZenQ, Patni Computer Systems, Bank of America, Sumtotal systems, Redpine Signals, Beryl Consulting
 Building - 3  - IBM.
 Building - 4  - Computer Sciences Corporation.
 Building - 5  - Bank of America, Redpine Signals.
 Building - 6  - Qualcomm.
 Building - 7  - Computer Sciences Corporation.
 Building - 8  - Qualcomm, PL Engineering, Deloitte, UTC Fire & Security
 Building - 9  - Verizon, Amazon, Broadcom, Qualcomm, HSBC, Deloitte, PerkinElmer.
 Building - 10 - Verizon, Qualcomm, Broadcom, Raheja India.
 Building - 11  - JP Morgan, Thomson Reuters, Advanced Micro Devices.
 Building - 12A - Cognizant Technology Solutions, Pegasystems Inc.
 Building - 14 - Portware, United Health Group, Persistent Systems & Solutions Ltd, OpenText Corporation, LGS Global Ltd, Trianz, Yash Technologies Pvt. Ltd, ZenQ, Verity Knowledge Solutions Pvt Ltd.
 Building - 20 - Parexel, vSplash Techlabs Pvt. Ltd, Cognizant Technology Solutions, YASH Technologies, RealPage, OMICS, PROLIFICS (Semantic Space Technologies).
 Building - 21 - Colruyt IT Consultancy
 HUDA Techno Enclave - Ocimum Bio Solutions

HITEX Exhibition Centre 

Hyderabad International Trade Expositions Limited (HITEX) is a venue for international exhibitions, conferences, trade shows, and corporate events in India. Exhibition centre was conceptualised by German architects and opened on 14 January 2003 by Commerce Minister Arun Shourie, and the Hitex Trade Fair Office Building was inaugurated by Andhra Pradesh former Chief Minister N. Chandrababu Naidu.

HITEX is located at Madhapur (near HITEC City).

GITEX Hyderabad, is the annual IT&C expo organised by the Dubai World Trade Centre in association with the Department of IT&C, Government of Telangana.

HITEC City-2 SEZ

HITEC City-2 is a milestone project of Phoenix Infocity Pvt. Ltd. This is a venture by Phoenix Group, India. HITEC City-2 is an IT/ITeS Special Economic Zone (SEZ), and it is being promoted as an extension of HITEC City. The project has received formal approval as an IT/ITeS SEZ from the Ministry of Commerce, Government of India.

It has accommodated MNCs like

 UBS (the Indian operations of which were recently acquired by Cognizant)
 CUBIC Transportation Systems India Private Limited
 ValueMomentum
 MAQ Software
 HCL
 ValueLabs Inc.
 Object Technologies
 IGATE

Cyber Pearl (an Ascendas IT park) 

CyberPearl is located in the heart of Hyderabad's growth centre. Numerous MNC campuses, commercial facilities and extensive social infrastructure are located nearby the park. Opened in 2004, CyberPearl was the first park in Hyderabad to feature a fully equipped health club and business centre. In-house amenities include a large food court, restaurant, meeting rooms, conference and recreational facilities. Cyber Pearl would have been named Cyber Oasis, but since Hyderabad is associated with pearls, "Pearl" was considered more appropriate. The park accommodates over 5000 IT workers with 5,000,000 square feet (460,000 m2) of office space. Companies located at Cyber Pearl are :

 Winshuttle Software (India) Pvt. Ltd.
 TNS INDIA PVT. LTD.
 Sitel India Ltd
 GE
 Innopark
 UMC
 NTT DATA
 Tech Mahindra
 Salesforce dotcom
 MarketTools Research Pvt Ltd
 RSA/Valyd Software
 SD Softech
 Smartplay Technologies
 ZenQ
 Bank of Baroda - DR Site
CenturyLink

Facebook, Hyderabad 
Facebook has had an office in Cyberabad since 2010. It was the fourth Facebook office worldwide.

Amazon Global Campus 
Amazon first started operations in India in 2004 from Hyderabad. Global e-commerce giant amazon inaugurates its first owned and world’s largest campus building in 2019 at Hyderabad that spread across 9.5 acres which can house for more than 15,000 employees, becoming third of Amazon’s total India employee base across six offices. This is Amazon’s single largest building in the anywhere worldwide in terms of total built-up area and the campus will spread out with spanning over 68 acres.

Other campuses around HITEC city 

Oracle Campus, HITEC City
Microsoft R&D Campus in Gachibowli, Hyderabad.

Several companies have opened built to suit facilities in and around HITEC city. Some of these are:

 Tecreos Overseas Education Consultants
 Ananth Technologies
 Aurobindo Pharma, Water Mark Building
 Computer Maintenance Corporation
 Convergys Campus
 Cyient Campus
 NetCracker Technology Corp.
 DELL Campus
 CyberCity I.T. Campus
 E-Park I.T. Campus (Currently leased by TCS)
 Franklin Templeton campus
 Honeywell Campus
 Hindustan Petroleum Corporation Limited. IT Data Centre
 HSBC Campus
 Capgemini Campus
 iLabs Centre
 Infosys Campus
 Login4ITES Network
 Microsoft Campus
 Motorola Campus
 Oracle Campus
 Polaris Campus
 Tech Mahindra Cyber Space Campus
 Tech Mahindra Infocity Campus
 Reliance Communications
 Sierra Atlantic Campus
 SoftSol Campus
 Tata Consultancy Services (TCS) Campus (Deccan Park)
 UBS (now Cognizant)
 ValueLabs Campus
 VSNL campus
 WIPRO Campus (Gachibowli)
 Zensar technologies Ltd
 Simply Write Consulting Services

The V, an Ascendas IT Park 
The V is spread across 20 acres (8 ha) and has five multi-tenant buildings with a gross floor area of 1.65 million sq ft (90,000 m2) having close to 100% occupancy.

With over 10 acres (4 ha) of open space, it is a green township with landscaped gardens. Most of the large rock formations have been left untouched, with the buildings designed around the natural landscape. The V is the first IT park which is completely operational. It accommodates about 15,000 IT professionals.

It is about 10 km from the city center and 14 km from the airport, both being within an hour's drive. The nearest local train station is around 3 km from the campus.

The V is composed of five buildings.

 Mariner
 Auriga
 Orion
 Capella
 Vega

The TCS Deccan Park Campus 

The Deccan park is the largest global development centre of the Tata Consultancy Services. The facility was designed by Swiss architect Mario Botta. The Deccan Park has been set up with an estimated investment of 15 billion with recreation and sporting facilities, which houses more than 2,200 professionals. The centre has been set up in 11 acres (4.5 ha) of land, with a built-up area around 320,000 ft² (30,000 m2) on 9 floors. The centre works in domain areas such as telecommunications, e-governance, biological sciences, ports, and shipping and also deploy technologies including .Net, opensource billing and bioinformatics.

RMZ Futura IT Park 

RMZ FUTURA is an exclusive independent/built-to-suit facility set amidst HITEC city owned by RMZ Corp, adjacent to Cyber Gateway. The state-of-the-art structure comprises four independent blocks spread across the entire site.

The RMZ FUTURA IT Park is composed of four buildings. All four buildings have been occupied.

 CGI on the fourth floor; other floors constitute Deloitte Block A
 Deloitte Block B
 Deloitte Block C
 Deloitte Block D

Shilpakala Vedika 

Shilpakala Vedika, constructed under the government of N. Chandrababu Naidu, is located in a 60,000 sq ft (5,600 m2) plot, on a 5 acres (20,000 m2) land, with a seating capacity of 2,500. It is a state-of-the-art facility comprising a press room, cafeteria, modern multi-media projection system, luxurious green rooms, good acoustics and exquisite ethnic decor. This auditorium was held by M/S Sanpra Group and M/S Alif Group under a BOOT contract.

See also
 Genome Valley
Fintech Valley Vizag

References

Neighbourhoods in Hyderabad, India
Economy of Telangana
Economy of Hyderabad, India
Industries in Hyderabad, India
IBM facilities
Science parks in India
High-technology business districts in India
Industrial parks in India